The Sinister Urge is the second solo studio album from former White Zombie frontman Rob Zombie. The album is the follow up to his highly successful debut album Hellbilly Deluxe, released in 1998. The album was released by Geffen Records on November 13, 2001, more than three years after the release of his first album. The album's title is named after the 1961 crime drama film The Sinister Urge, directed and written by Ed Wood. Much like his previous effort, The Sinister Urge features elements of horror film and suspense in both its lyrical content and its music. Zombie also features a change of sound in several songs on the album when compared to Hellbilly, with songs such as "Never Gonna Stop (The Red, Red Kroovy)" featuring a more dance-influenced beat.

The album only spawned one commercial single, "Demon Speeding", which was released in June 2002. The song was a hit on the Billboard Hot Mainstream Rock Tracks chart in the United States, becoming Zombie's third Top 20 hit on the chart. Several songs from the album were released as promotional singles both before and after the album's release. The song "Scum of the Earth" was featured on the Mission: Impossible 2 soundtrack, while "Never Gonna Stop (The Red, Red Kroovy)", "Feel So Numb" and "Dead Girl Superstar" were released as promotional singles throughout 2001 and 2002. The album itself was a commercial success, becoming Zombie's second consecutive studio album to enter inside the Top 10 of the Billboard 200. The album went on to receive a Platinum certification from the RIAA, for shipments exceeding one million copies.

The Sinister Urge received mixed to positive critical reviews, but has become a fan favorite. Songs from the album were used in numerous television series and films, similar to the success of Zombie's previous album. Songs from the album have been covered by numerous artists, with some of these covers appearing on the 2002 tribute album The Electro-Industrial Tribute to Rob Zombie. To date, The Sinister Urge has sold nearly two million copies worldwide, and was his second RIAA-certified album. The Sinister Urge is one of three Rob Zombie albums to reach Platinum status, along with Hellbilly Deluxe and the 2003 compilation album Past, Present & Future. It is the final album to include guitarist Mike Riggs and drummer John Tempesta, who had been part of the Rob Zombie band line-up since 1998.

Background & development
On The Sinister Urge, Zombie worked with numerous writers and producers from his previous album, Hellbilly Deluxe. Scott Humphrey returned to produce the album, while former White Zombie band member John Tempesta returned to play drums for the album. On the concept behind the album, Zombie stated "I didn't really have a theme, I used to think that way but now I try not to have a preconceived idea because then you sort of box yourself into a corner and then everything doesn't fit. You actually end up throwing away better songs because you think it has to be a certain way." Zombie worked with music legend and  Black Sabbath singer Ozzy Osbourne on the song "Iron Head", featured as the fifth track on the album. On the collaboration, Zombie stated "I thought that somehow the song didn't seem special enough. Somehow I thought that the song wasn't as good as it should be and I had been talking to Ozzy a lot and working on stuff for the tour and someone was like, 'Why don't you just get Ozzy to fucking do it?' It was like, duh. Sometimes you don't think of the obvious ideas." Kerry King of thrash metal band Slayer provides a guitar solo for the song "Dead Girl Superstar".

Composition
Zombie stated that his previous album, Hellbilly Deluxe, featured a lot of electronics, whereas The Sinister Urge features a live band, meaning more emphasis on the instrumentals. "Never Gonna Stop (The Red, Red Kroovy)" is said to "showcase handclaps and acoustic guitars". The song's video is inspired by the film A Clockwork Orange.

Release and artwork
The Sinister Urge was released on November 13, 2001 via Geffen Records. The album cover features Zombie with a green tint around him with a light blue background. The cover for the explicit version of the album features a skull and crossbones not found on the clean edition.

Legacy
In 2012, it was voted as the fan-favorite album, with Hellbilly Deluxe coming in second place.

Track listing

Personnel

Music
 Rob Zombie – vocals, lyricist, producer, art direction, photos, package design
 Riggs – guitars
 Blasko – bass
 Tempesta – drums
 Emm Gryner – female vocals
 Evelyne Bennu – female vocals
 Ozzy Osbourne – additional vocals on "Iron Head"
 Phil X – additional guitars
 Danny Lohner – additional guitars
 Kerry King – additional guitars on "Dead Girl Superstar"
 Chris Chaney – additional bass
 Josh Freese – additional drums
 Tommy Lee – additional drums
 Gary Novak – additional drums
 Bennett Salvay – string arrangements
 Jerry Hey – horns
 Bill Reichenbach Jr. – horns
 Daniel Wiggins – horns
 Gary Grant – horns
 DJ Lethal – turntables
 Mix Master Mike – turntables

Production
 Scott Humphrey – producer, programming, mixing, additional guitar
 Frank Gryner – engineering, mixing, additional guitar
 Tom Baker – mastering
 Dan Burns – assistant engineer
 Marina Chavez – photos

Charts

Weekly charts

Year-end charts

References

Rob Zombie albums
2001 albums
Geffen Records albums
Albums produced by Rob Zombie
Albums produced by Scott Humphrey